Haywood County is a county located in the U.S. state of North Carolina. As of the 2020 census, the population was 62,089. The county seat and its largest city is Waynesville. Haywood County is part of the Asheville, NC Metropolitan Statistical Area.

History
Part of indigenous territory considered the Cherokee homeland, the county was formed by European Americans in 1808 from the western part of Buncombe County. It was named for John Haywood, who served as the North Carolina State Treasurer from 1787 to 1827.

In 1828 the western part of Haywood County became Macon County.  In 1851 parts of Haywood and Macon counties were combined to form Jackson County.

The last shot of the Civil War east of the Mississippi was fired in Waynesville on May 9, 1865, when elements of the Thomas Legion (Confederate) skirmished with the 2nd North Carolina Mounted Infantry (Union). A monument is situated on Sulphur Springs Road in Waynesville.

Geography

The Pigeon River originates in Haywood County. All rivers and springs that flow in Haywood County originate in the county; no water flows into Haywood County from adjacent counties.

Haywood County is situated amidst the Blue Ridge Mountains and contains parts of several major subranges of the Blue Ridge, namely the Great Smoky Mountains in the west and the Plott Balsams and Great Balsam Mountains in the south. Black Balsam Knob, in the Great Balsam Mountains in the southeastern section of the county, is the highest grassy bald in the entire Appalachian range.

A portion of Great Smoky Mountains National Park lies in the northwestern section of the county, north of Maggie Valley. Other protected areas include substantial sections of the Pisgah National Forest in the far northeastern and southern parts of the county.

National protected areas
 Blue Ridge Parkway (part)
 Great Smoky Mountains National Park (part)
 Mountains to Sea Trail (part)
 Nantahala National Forest (part)
 Cherokee Indian Reservation/Qualla Boundary (part)
 Middle Prong Wilderness Area
 Shining Rock Wilderness Area (part)
 The Appalachian Trail (part)

State and local protected areas 
 Harmon Den Wildlife Management Area (part)
 Pisgah View State Park (part)

Major water bodies 
 Bald Creek
 Big Creek
 Cooks Creek
 Cove Creek
 Crabtree Creek
 Lake Junaluska
 Lake Logan
 Laurel Creek
 Little Creek
 Pigeon River
 Rocky Branch Lake
 Waterville Lake

Adjacent counties
 Cocke County, Tennessee - north
 Sevier County, Tennessee - northwest
 Madison County - northeast
 Buncombe County - east
 Henderson County - southeast
 Transylvania County - south
 Jackson County - southwest
 Swain County - west

Major highways

Major infrastructure
 The Blue Ridge Southern Railroad operates a portion a line through Haywood County, providing a rail connection with the rest of the country. The Blue Ridge Southern Railroad's main classification yard is located in Canton, which directly serves Evergreen Packaging (owned by International Paper) and originates several local runs.

Demographics

2020 census

As of the 2020 United States census, there were 62,089 people, 26,653 households, and 17,170 families residing in the county.

2000 census
As of the census of 2000, there were 54,033 people, 23,100 households, and 16,054 families residing in the county. The population density was 98 people per square mile (38/km2). There were 28,640 housing units at an average density of 52 per square mile (20/km2). The racial makeup of the county was 96.85% White, 1.27% Black or African American, 0.49% Native American, 0.21% Asian, 0.04% Pacific Islander, 0.44% from other races, and 0.71% from two or more races. 1.41% of the population were Hispanic or Latino of any race. 30.8% were of American, 12.9% English, 12.0% German, 10.4% Irish and 8.3% Scots-Irish ancestry according to Census 2000. 97.1% spoke English and 1.9% Spanish as their first language.

There were 23,100 households, out of which 26.20% had children under the age of 18 living with them, 56.70% were married couples living together, 9.50% had a female householder with no husband present, and 30.50% were non-families. 26.70% of all households were made up of individuals, and 12.30% had someone living alone who was 65 years of age or older. The average household size was 2.30 and the average family size was 2.76.

In the county, the population was spread out, with 20.80% under the age of 18, 6.20% from 18 to 24, 26.90% from 25 to 44, 27.10% from 45 to 64, and 19.00% who were 65 years of age or older. The median age was 42 years. For every 100 females there were 92.00 males. For every 100 females age 18 and over, there were 88.70 males.

The median income for a household in the county was $33,922, and the median income for a family was $40,438. Males had a median income of $30,731 versus $21,750 for females. The per capita income for the county was $18,554. About 8.10% of families and 11.50% of the population were below the poverty line, including 17.40% of those under age 18 and 10.30% of those age 65 or over.

Government, law, and public safety

Government
Haywood County is governed by an elected five member four-year term County Board of Commissioners. The Board appoints and directs policy for a county manager. Haywood County is a member of the regional Southwestern Commission council of governments.

Policing

Sheriff and municipal police
The Haywood County sheriff provides court protection and jail management for the entire county and provides patrol and detective services for the unincorporated portions of the county. The towns of Waynesville, Canton, and Maggie Valley have municipal police departments. As of October 1, 2020 the Sheriff's Office took over all law enforcement service for the town of Clyde. Haywood County contains a portion of the Qualla Boundary which is a tribal reservation for the Eastern Band of Cherokee Indians. Lands and people living within this reservation are subject mostly to tribal/federal laws rather than county or state laws.

Lake Junaluska
Security for Lake Junaluska is provided by the Haywood County sheriff.

Fire protection
Fire protection and rescue services are provided by the Clyde, Cruso, North Canton, Saunook, Waynesville, Crabtree-Ironduff, Maggie Valley, Junaluska, Center Pigeon, Canton, Jonathan Creek, Fines Creek, and Lake Logan-Cecil Fire Departments.

Politics
Haywood County was a Democratic-leaning swing county for essentially the entire 20th century. Since 2000, however, it has seen a strong trend toward the Republican Party in national elections. Donald Trump's 2020 performance of 62.5% was the best by a Republican in Haywood County since Nixon's 1972 landslide.

Education
Haywood County Schools has 15 schools ranging from pre-kindergarten to twelfth grade. Those are separated into three high schools, three middle schools, and nine elementary schools.

Tuscola-Pisgah rivalry

The two major high schools in the Haywood County Schools System, the Tuscola High School Mountaineers of Waynesville and Pisgah High School Black Bears of Canton participate in one of the fiercest high school rivalries in the Nation, as cited by the Great American Rivalry Series. The two high school football teams battle it out for the Haywood County Championship each fall, drawing up to 15,000 fans. Pisgah now leads the series at 30-26-1. The Pisgah Bears have won the last 8 meetings.

Festivals
The annual ramp (Allium tricoccum) convention in Haywood County, known as the oldest in the Nation, has drawn as many as 4,000 participants a year since its inception circa 1925. It is held each May.

Folkmoot USA is an international folk festival held since 1984 in Waynesville, North Carolina and surrounding communities. During its history, the two-week event has featured around 200 groups from approximately 100 countries. The Southeast Tourism Society has named Folkmoot USA one of its top twenty events for 20 years. The North Carolina General Assembly declared Folkmoot USA to be the state's official international folk festival in 2003.

Communities

Towns
 Waynesville, (county seat and largest town)
 Canton
 Clyde
 Maggie Valley

Census-designated places
 Lake Junaluska
 West Canton

Unincorporated communities
 Cruso
 Saunook

Other well known communities/areas
 Eagles Nest
 Max Patch
 Cataloochee
 Junaluska
 Center Pigeon
 Dutch Cove

Townships

 Beaverdam
 Bethel
 Cataloochee
 Cecil
 Clyde
 Crabtree
 Cruso
 East Fork
 Fines Creek
 Iron Duff
 Ivy Hill
 Jonathan Creek
 Pigeon
 Suttontown
 Waynesville
 White Oak

In popular culture
Cold Mountain, in southeast Haywood County within the Pisgah National Forest, became popularly known when featured as the title and setting of the 1997 historical novel Cold Mountain by Charles Frazier. He explored the later stages of the American Civil War in the area and a Confederate soldier's effort to return home. The novel was adapted as a major motion picture, released by Miramax Films in 2003 and starring Nicole Kidman, Jude Law, and Renée Zellweger.

See also
 List of counties in North Carolina
 National Register of Historic Places listings in Haywood County, North Carolina
 North Carolina State Parks
 National Park Service
 List of national forests of the United States

References

External links

 
 
 Haywood County Tourism Development Authority website

 
Asheville metropolitan area
1808 establishments in North Carolina
Populated places established in 1808
Counties of Appalachia
Haywood family